The Halberg Awards are a set of awards, given annually since 1949, recognising New Zealand's top sporting achievements. They are named for New Zealand former middle-distance runner and Olympic gold medalist Sir Murray Halberg. The initial award was handed out in 1949, and continued until 1960 under the auspices of the NZ Sportsman magazine. Since 1963, the awards have been organised by the Halberg Disability Sport Foundation, and the number of award categories has grown to eight.

History
The annual award was started in 1949 by NZ Sportsman magazine founders Maurice O’Connor and Jack Fairburn. The award was designed by them and bought from Walker and Hall for £195 NZ. The original inscription on the trophy was Fairburn and O’Connors words: "The New Zealand Sportsman's Trophy to be awarded annually to the New Zealand athlete whose personal performances or example, has had the most beneficial effect on the advancement of sport in the country". Awarding of the New Zealand Sportsman's Trophy ceased along with publication of NZ Sportsman in 1960. 

After a two-year hiatus, Murray Halberg revived the event in 1963 through the Halberg Disability Sport Foundation. The rules were altered in 1971 to allow teams to win the award, which that year went to the New Zealand eight.

The Awards are presented at a dinner which traditionally rotates between the New Zealand cities of Dunedin, Christchurch, Wellington and Auckland, and which in recent years has been broadcast live on television. Over time, the award was expanded to include New Zealand Sportswoman of the year, New Zealand Team of the year, Sky Sport Coach of the year, Emerging Talent and Halberg Disability Sport Foundation Disabled Sportsperson of the Year awards, as well as the Lion Foundation Lifetime Achievement Award, the Sport New Zealand Leadership Award and an award for New Zealand's Favourite Sporting Moment. The award was eventually renamed in Murray Halberg's honour, and since then the supreme award has been known as the Halberg award.

The Awards help the Halberg Disability Sport Foundation to raise funds, which are then used to enhance the lives of physically disabled young people, their families and communities, by enabling them to participate in sport.

The awards for 2019 were held on 13 February 2020, prior to COVID-19 pandemic halting large events. With international sporting events during 2020 affected by COVID-19 pandemic, it was decided to award a decade championship at the 2021 ceremony. The previous winners between 2010 and 2019 across the eight award categories are eligible. The decade awards were scheduled for 18 February 2021 to be held in Auckland. After the Auckland region went to COVID-19 Level 3 on 15 February 2021, the Halberg Awards were postponed. The 59th awards were held on February 23 2022 with audience restrictions because of the COVID-19 red alert level.

Winners

Supreme Award

The annual award was started in 1949 by NZ Sportsman magazine founders Jack Fairburn and Maurice O’Connor to be awarded annually to the New Zealand athlete whose personal performances or example have had the most beneficial effect on the advancement of sport in New Zealand, as selected by a team of national sporting journalists. The title was "Sportsman of the Year Award" which was awarded annually until 1960 and was discontinued until 1963 when a charity set up by the 1958 winner, Murray Halberg, continued the event from 1963 onwards. The Halberg Disability Sport Foundation renamed the award in 1987 to the Halberg Award, and started having gender-specific awards, introducing the Supreme Award as a new category chosen from all other award categories.

Hence, the table below shows the (gender-neutral) Sportsman of the Year Award winners as determined by NZ Sportsman (1949–1960), the Sportsman of the Year Award winners as determined by the Halberg Disability Sport Foundation (1963–1986), and the Halberg Award from 1987 onwards.

Sportsman of the Year

Sportswoman of the Year

Team of the Year

Para Athlete or Team of the Year

Coach of the Year

Emerging Talent Award

Favourite Sporting Moment
The Favourite Sporting Moment is decided by a public vote, unlike the other awards which are decided by a judging panel.

Category finalists and winners
Category winners are in bold

2020s

2022
The finalists were announced on 11 January 2023, except for the favourite sporting moment, for which the finalists were announced six days later. The winners were announced on 15 February 2023.

2021
The finalists were announced on 12 January 2022, except for the favourite sporting moment, for which the finalists were announced two days later, and cover achievements in both 2020 and 2021. The winners were announced on 23 February 2022.

2020
The 2020 awards were deferred because of the COVID-19 pandemic, with performances during 2020 eligible for inclusion in the 2021 Halberg Awards.

2010s
The winners for the decade awards were announced on 24 March 2021.

2019
The finalists were announced on 14 January 2020 except for the favourite sporting moment, which was announced on 16 January. The awards ceremony was held on 13 February at the Spark Arena in Auckland.

2018
The finalists were announced on 10 January 2019, with the awards ceremony being held on 21 February.

2017
The finalists were announced on 11 January 2018, with the awards ceremony being held on 8 February.

2016
The finalists were announced on 11 January 2017 and the awards ceremony was held on 9 February.

2015
The finalists for the 2015 awards were announced on 14 January 2016, and the awards ceremony was held on 18 February.

2014
The finalists were announced on 7 January 2015. The winners were announced at the awards ceremony on 11 February 2015.

2013
The winners were announced at the awards ceremony on 13 February 2014 at Vector Arena, Auckland.

2012
The finalists for the 2012 Halberg Awards were announced on 31 December 2012. The winners were announced at the awards ceremony on 14 February 2013 at Vector Arena, Auckland.

2011

2010

2000s

2009

2008

2007

2006

2005

2004

References

External links
 Awards site

New Zealand sports trophies and awards
1949 establishments in New Zealand
Awards established in 1949